The U.S. state of Ohio first required its residents to register their motor vehicles and display license plates in 1908, although several cities within the state issued their own license plates from as early as 1902.

, plates are issued by the Ohio Bureau of Motor Vehicles (BMV), a division of the Ohio Department of Public Safety. Only rear plates have been required for all classes of vehicles, except commercial tractors, since July 1, 2020. However, vehicle owners can request specialized, personalized plate serials, in addition to their rear plates, for an extra charge. But eventually that 2nd plate option will phase out when state legislation passes a bill.  All plates are manufactured by inmates at Ohio Penal Industries at the Lebanon Correctional Institution; since 2015, they have been manufactured out of aluminum, having been made of galvanized steel beforehand. The BMV issues a new license plate design about every five years, or with each new administration in the state government.

A new "Sunrise in Ohio" plate design was unveiled by Governor Mike DeWine on October 21, 2021, and was made available to drivers December 29, 2021, replacing the "Ohio Pride" design which had been issued since April 2013.

History
On May 19, 1902, Cleveland became one of the first cities in the country to require motorists to display government-issued registration numbers on their vehicles. In the following years, various local governments in Ohio issued standard metal plates of varying design or numerals (to be mounted on a dark background), including:

Canton (1905)
Cleveland (1907–08)
Cincinnati (initials only 1903–05; 1906–08; motorcycles in 1911, 1913), abbreviated "Cinti"
Columbus (1907–08), abbreviated "Col's"
Dayton (1905, 1907, 1908; motorcycles in 1909, 1912, 1913)
Delhi Township, Hamilton County (1906–08), abbreviated "Delhi"
East Liverpool (Health Department vehicles in 1924)
Elyria (motorcycles in 1910)
Hamilton (1907), abbreviated "Haml"
Lima (motorcycles in 1908, 1912–13)
Lorain (1907)
Mansfield (1903)
Massillon (1906), abbreviated "M"
Newark (motorcycles in 1912–13)
Sandusky (1903)
Springfield (unknown; motorcycles in 1913), abbreviated "Spfd" on motorcycles
Toledo (1904, 1907)
Warren (1908)

In 1906, the state attempted to take over auto registration under the Ward Automobile Law, but litigation delayed the program until the Ohio Supreme Court ruled in favor of the law. The Ohio Secretary of State's Automobile Division, precursor to the Bureau of Motor Vehicles, was established in 1907. The Ward Law went into effect on June 11, 1908, but the Automobile Division did not begin issuing plates for another 30 days due to a manufacturing defect. The first state vehicle registration was issued to Cincinnati resident Thomas B. Paxton, Jr., for his Franklin automobile. Locally issued and owner-provided license plates were phased out by 1909 for automobiles, but local plates continued to be used for motorcycles until 1914. One effect of the Ward Law was to eliminate a significant revenue stream for cities like Cincinnati, which took in about $5,000 a year (equivalent to $ today) from auto registrations.

The Ward Law required automobile owners to display plates at both the front and the rear of the vehicle. Front and rear plates would be issued for passenger vehicles for over a century, through June 30, 2020, with the exception of 1944–46 when only rear plates were issued due to metal conservation for World War II. Ohio issued single-year plates from 1910 through 1973, except in 1943 and 1952 when windshield stickers were issued to revalidate the previous year's plates, again due to metal conservation (for World War II and the Korean War respectively).

Various Ohio license plate designs from 1908 to 1921 used distinctive monograms instead of a fully spelled-out state name. The 1938 plate commemorated the 150th anniversary of the creation of the Northwest Territory (from which the state of Ohio was formed), and thus was the first plate in the state to feature a graphic and a slogan. In 1953, the Bureau of Motor Vehicles commemorated the state's sesquicentennial by issuing a special front plate bearing the state shape and the word "sesqui-centennial"  instead of the passenger serial, which was carried only on the rear plate.

From 1935 through 1979, serials were allocated in blocks to each of the state's 88 counties. Serials were originally up to five characters in length and featured one or two letters. Increased demand resulted in the introduction of six-character serials in 1949, followed by all-numeric serials in 1962. The scheme was finally abandoned in 1980.

The 1956 (dated 1957) issue was the first Ohio license plate that fully complied with these standards: the state had been issuing plates 6 inches in height by 12 inches in width since 1926, and all plates of the 1952 (dated 1953) and 1955 (dated 1956) issues were to these dimensions, but none had had standard mounting holes.

In 1967, the state began issuing special plates to DUI offenders with limited driving privileges. Judges in Ohio, however, rarely issued them until a 2004 state law made it mandatory for all DUI offenders with limited driving privileges to have them.

After the last single-year plate was issued in 1973, the 1974 plate was revalidated for 1975 with a sticker placed at the bottom right corner. The first undated, multi-year plate was issued in 1976, while monthly staggered registration was introduced in 1979.

Since 1983, plates have carried the county of issuance on a sticker. Originally, this was a long sticker centered at the bottom of the plate, displaying the county name. In 1992, the state introduced a numerical county-coding scheme (see the County Coding section below), with the county number being displayed on a red sticker at the bottom left corner of the plate; this scheme was initially used only on specialty plates before being adopted on standard passenger plates when the Bicentennial base was introduced in October 2001. The scheme was discontinued on standard passenger plates in 2018 in favor of a return to county-name stickers, again centered at the bottom of the plate.

On April 3, 2019, Governor Mike DeWine signed a two-year state transportation budget bill that included the elimination of the requirement for front license plates to be displayed. This became effective on July 1, 2020.

Passenger baseplates

1908 to 1973

1974 to present
All Ohio passenger plates issued since October 2001 are valid for display today, provided they have been continuously registered. "Ohio Gold" plates, issued from August 1996 through September 2001, are to be replaced during 2022 due to readability issues arising from degradation of the reflective sheeting through exposure to humidity, rain, snow, and road salt.

Alternative passenger plates

Renewal stickers

Non-passenger plates

From 1976 until 1996, license plates for pickup trucks and other light truck-related vehicles (SUVs and conversion vans aside) were issued truck plates that said "Non Comm" (for "non-commercial truck") while semi-trucks were issued plates that said "Commercial". Since 1996, however, the more consumer-oriented truck plates now say "Truck" instead of "Non-Comm."

Temporary tags 
Vehicles purchased from a dealership are given a 30-day or 45-day temporary tag. The paper tag is filled out by hand. Since March 2001, it has featured a hologram. On a 2001-series temporary tag, the plate number is preprinted, while the expiration date and vehicle details are written in permanent marker. As of August, 2020, the Ohio Department of Public Safety issues print-on-demand temporary tags and will phase out traditional paper tags in January 2021.

County coding
In 1992, Ohio began using a numerical county-coding scheme to indicate the county of registration. The scheme assigns a two-digit number to each of the state's 88 counties in alphabetical order, beginning with 01 for Adams County and ending with 88 for Wyandot County. The scheme has been used on specialty plates since its introduction, and was also used on standard passenger plates from 2001 until 2018.

The county number is displayed on red stickers placed at the bottom left corner the plate. The stickers also display the county name, in small print below the number.

List of county numbers

Reserved series
On recent seven-character baseplates, the state has reserved certain letter series to be issued in coordination with specific car dealerships or leasing agencies.

References

External links

 OPLATES.com Ohio Bureau of Motor Vehicles customer website
 Ohio Bureau of Motor Vehicles: Registration and Titling
 Ohio BMV Chronological History 1908-2010, with a comprehensive listing of Ohio license plate designs since 1908
 Ohio license plates, 1969–present

Ohio
Transportation in Ohio
History of Ohio
Ohio transportation-related lists